David Charles Lowery (born September 10, 1960) is an American guitarist, vocalist, songwriter, mathematician, and activist. He is the founder of alternative rock band Camper Van Beethoven and co-founder of the more-traditional rock band Cracker. Lowery released his first solo album, The Palace Guards, in February 2011.

Biography

Personal life and music career
Lowery was born in San Antonio, Texas, the son of a career Air Force father. He has described his parents as "a hillbilly and an English working-class woman." His family moved around a great deal during his youth before finally settling in Redlands, California, where he attended high school. He became involved in music as a member of the band Sitting Ducks, who played a mixture of punk and acid rock, along with what Lowery described as "fake Russian-sounding music." Sitting Ducks subsequently evolved into Camper Van Beethoven, formed in 1983 in Santa Cruz, California. The band is best known for its cover of the Status Quo song "Pictures of Matchstick Men" from the Key Lime Pie LP and its original composition "Take the Skinheads Bowling," from the band's 1985 debut LP, Telephone Free Landslide Victory, later featured in the Michael Moore movie Bowling for Columbine.

In the early 1990s, Lowery formed Cracker with guitarist and long-time friend Johnny Hickman and bassist Davey Faragher. Cracker rejected the indie-rock sound of Camper Van Beethoven in favor of a more traditional, roots-rock sound. Cracker's biggest hits are "Teen Angst (What the World Needs Now)" from its eponymous LP, released in 1992, and "Low," from 1993's Kerosene Hat. Cracker continues to perform today, although Camper Van Beethoven has also reformed, releasing a cover of the entire Fleetwood Mac album Tusk in 2002 and several new albums of original music, beginning with New Roman Times in 2004.

From 1990 to 1995, Lowery and Hickman also collaborated frequently with German band Freiwillige Selbstkontrolle (a/k/a FSK) and were occasionally listed as full members. Lowery produced and performed on the FSK albums Son Of Kraut (1991), The Sound Of Music (1993) and International (1995), to which he also contributed some of his own compositions (e.g. "Red Sonja" and "Dr Bernice" on The Sound of Music). Both Lowery and Hickman also joined FSK for concert tours in Europe and the US.

Lowery has also done work as a producer at Sound of Music Studios in Richmond, Virginia, working on records by Sparklehorse, Counting Crows, Lauren Hoffman, September 67, Wormburner, LP, Tea Leaf Green, Magnet, Sons of Bill and others. Lowery, along with Ian Solla-Yates of WNRN started RadioVA with Sound of Music in May 2010, an interview program hosted by David that has featured The Hold Steady, Drive-By Truckers, Minus the Bear and Edward Sharpe and the Magnetic Zeros.

On September 13, 2010, David married Velena Vego. Vego has been the manager for both Cracker and Camper Van Beethoven since 2004. She is also the talent booker for the 40 Watt Club in Athens, Georgia, and Buckhead Theatre in Atlanta.

Other activities 
Lowery graduated from the University of California Santa Cruz in 1984 with a Bachelor of Arts in mathematics.
He earned an Ed.D. from the University of Georgia in 2018. Lowery has worked as a "quant" (a derivatives trader and financial analyst) and has started a number of music-related businesses, including a studio, a record company and a publishing company.
Lowery's extensive experience in business led to his appointment as a lecturer in the University of Georgia's music business program. Charles Pitter at PopMatters has said that "in addition to this work, Lowery teaches as a lecturer and has a consistently high profile in the media as a champion of artists rights. As such, it could almost be said that Lowery has become the voice of a generation; however, it seems likely he would dismiss this title as meaningless blabber."

Lowery is critical of the internet era and states that things might be worse for working musicians than under the old record system. In 2012, he gave a widely shared talk called "Meet the new boss, worse than the old boss" in which he criticized Pandora Radio for low songwriter royalties, claiming to have made less than $17 from a million streams of his song "Low."

In 2017, Spotify settled a class action lawsuit initiated by Lowery and Melissa Ferrick covering unpaid mechanical royalties. As part of the settlement, Spotify set up a fund worth over $40 million to compensate songwriters and publishers affected. 
In January 2019, Lowery settled a lawsuit against Napster, which concerned unpaid mechanical royalties.

Discography (solo)

 The Palace Guards (2011)
 Conquistador (2016)
 In The Shadow of the Bull (2019)
 Leaving Key Member Clause (2021)
 Vending Machine (2023)

References

External links 

 David Lowery's "300 Songs" Blog
 RadioVA
 David Lowery's personal blog and music collection at MOG.com
 David Lowery collection at the Internet Archive's live music archive
 Cracker collection at the Internet Archive's live music archive
 PopGurls Interview: David Lowery

1960 births
Living people
American derivatives traders
American financial analysts
American investors
American rock guitarists
American male guitarists
American male singer-songwriters
American music industry executives
American music publishers (people)
American rock songwriters
American rock singers
Businesspeople from Texas
Musicians from San Antonio
Singer-songwriters from Texas
University of California, Santa Cruz alumni
University of Georgia faculty
Guitarists from Texas
Mathematicians from Texas
20th-century American guitarists
Camper Van Beethoven members
Cracker (band) members
American people of English descent
20th-century American singers
21st-century American guitarists
21st-century American singers
20th-century American male singers
21st-century American male singers